This is a list of Swedish football transfers in the winter transfer window 2017–18 by club.

Only transfers in and out between 8 January – 31 March 2018 of the Allsvenskan and Superettan are included.

Allsvenskan

AIK

In:

Out:

BK Häcken

In:

Out:

Dalkurd FF

In:

Out:

Djurgårdens IF

In:

Out:

GIF Sundsvall

In:

Out:

Hammarby IF

In:

Out:

IF Brommapojkarna

In:

Out:

IF Elfsborg

In:

Out:

IFK Göteborg

In:

Out:

IFK Norrköping

In:

Out:

IK Sirius

In:

Out:

Kalmar FF

In:

Out:

Malmö FF

In:

Out:

Örebro SK

In:

Out:

Östersunds FK

In:

Out:

Trelleborgs FF

In:

Out:

Superettan

AFC Eskilstuna

In:

Out:

Degerfors IF

In:

Out:

Falkenbergs FF

In:

Out:

GAIS

In:

Out:

Gefle IF

In:

Out:

Halmstads BK

In:

Out:

Helsingborgs IF

In:

Out:

IFK Värnamo

In:

Out:

IK Brage

In:

Out:

IK Frej

In:

Out:

Jönköpings Södra IF

In:

Out:

Landskrona BoIS

In:

Out:

Norrby IF

In:

Out:

Örgryte IS

In:

Out:

Östers IF

In:

Out:

Varbergs BoIS

In:

Out:

Damallsvenskan

Djurgårdens IF

In:

Out:

Eskilstuna United DFF

In:

Out:

FC Rosengård

In:

Out:

Hammarby IF

In:

Out:

IF Limhamn Bunkeflo

In:

Out:

IFK Kalmar

In:

Out:

Kopparbergs/Göteborg FC

In:

Out:

Kristianstads DFF

In:

Out:

Linköpings FC

In:

Out:

Piteå IF

In:

Out:

Växjö DFF

In:

Out:

Vittsjö GIK

In:

Out:

References

External links
 Official site of the SvFF 

Trans
Trans
2017-18
Sweden